Ginella Massa (born January 29, 1987) is a Canadian television journalist. An Afro-Latina Muslim reporter and anchor, she became Canada's first hijab-wearing television reporter in 2015, and the first news anchor in hijab when she anchored the 11 p.m. newscast for CityNews on CITY-DT in Toronto, Ontario, on November 17, 2016.

An honors graduate of York University and Seneca College, she has worked both behind-the-scenes and on-air for local and national Canadian news outlets since 2010, including CTV News, CFRB and Rogers Television, and has been published in The Globe and Mail and the National Post.

Massa married her husband in 2018 in Toronto.

In 2020, the Canadian Broadcasting Corporation announced that Massa will join the network as host of a prime time show on CBC News Network and a special correspondent for The National. Her show, Canada Tonight, premiered on January 11, 2021, on CBC News Network. In October 2022, Massa went on maternity leave, leading Dwight Drummond to become the temporary host of Canada Tonight for the next year.

References

External links
Official website

Living people
1987 births
Canadian television reporters and correspondents
Canadian television news anchors
Canadian Muslims
CBC Television people
Canadian women television journalists
Journalists from Toronto
Panamanian emigrants to Canada
Seneca College alumni
York University alumni
Black Canadian broadcasters
Canadian people of Panamanian descent